The League of the Future is a 1916 American silent short directed by Edward J. Le Saint. Starring William Garwood in the lead role, it is the fifth in the five film series Lord John's Journal.

Cast
William Garwood as Lord John
Malcolm Blevins as Richard Wayne
Stella Razeto as Maida Odell
Laura Oakley as Head Sister
Carmen Phillips as Jenny

See also
Lord John in New York (1915)
The Grey Sisterhood (1916)
Three Fingered Jenny (1916)
The Eye of Horus (1916)

References

External links

1916 films
American silent short films
American black-and-white films
American mystery films
Films directed by Edward LeSaint
1910s American films
Silent mystery films